Yordanka Yovkova (born 8 January 1933) is a Bulgarian gymnast. She competed in seven events at the 1952 Summer Olympics.

References

1933 births
Living people
Bulgarian female artistic gymnasts
Olympic gymnasts of Bulgaria
Gymnasts at the 1952 Summer Olympics
Place of birth missing (living people)